, is the second studio album by Japanese singer-songwriter Yumi Arai, released in October 1974.

Overview
The album title MISSLIM is derived from the word "MISS" & "SLIM" after the slim appearance of Yumi Arai at that time. Its jacket cover was taken from Kajiko Kawazoe's house and the grand piano also belongs to her too. The dress Arai was wearing was from Yves Saint Laurent. Before the album was released, the lead single "Yasashisa ni Tsutsumareta Nara" was released first, the song would get re-recorded as part of this album (as would its b-side, "Mahō no Kagami"). The single version was included in her album Yuming Brand. 

This was the first time that Tatsuro Yamashita collaborated with Yumi Arai as a chorus (arranger) for five years until her album OLIVE in 1979. In 1989, the album version of the song "Yasashisa ni Tsutsumareta Nara" was used as the ending theme for the Japanese release of Kiki's Delivery Service (it would later get reinstated for the 2010 rerelease of the English dub; it wasn't dubbed over for the 1990 JAL/Streamline dub). A cover of "Jūnigatsu no Ame", by Chay, was used as the opening theme for the NTV drama series Pretty Proofreader.

Release history
MISSLIM was released on October 1974 by Toshiba-EMI/Express (now part of EMI Music Japan). The album was also distributed by Alfa Records for a period of time, as Alfa also held ancillary rights to this and the other LPs Arai released during the time Alfa was still a publishing company; those rights later reverted to EMI Japan in 1994-thereabouts, when EMI regained distribution of Alfa's catalogue except for the artists who were published by Alfa and were distributed by other labels (and later retained most of it, including Arai's first 4 LPs [whose rights she had managed to buy before Alfa was sold to Sony], while the rest, the catalogue from when Alfa was a recording label and the bulk of the catalogue from when it was a publishing company, went with Sony Music Entertainment, including session player Haruomi Hosono's future work both as a solo musician and as part of Yellow Magic Orchestra). On April 26, 2000, the recording was digitally remastered for re-release on CD by Bernie Grundman. Internet sales of the album began March 10, 2005.

Tracklisting
Lyrics & Composition: Yumi Arai
Arrangements: Masataka Matsutoya

Personnel
Keyboards – Masataka Matsutoya
Drum – Tatsuo Hayashi
Bass Guitar, Cowbell – Haruomi Hosono
Electric Guitar – Shigeru Suzuki
Percussion – Tatsuo Hayashi (A-1, A-2, A-4, B-1, B-3), Nobu Saito (A-1, B-1), Haruomi Hosono (A-1, A-5)
Flat Mandolin – Masataka Matsutoya
Flute – Makio Shimizu (A-1)
Acoustic Guitar – Chuei Yoshikawa (A-2. A-3, A-5), Ryusuke Seto (B-5)
12-String Guitar – Shigeru Suzuki (A-5), Ryusuke Seto (A-3, B-5)
Pedal Steel Guitar – Hiroki Komazawa (A-3)
Chorus – Yumi Arai (A-3),  (A-1, A-2, A-5, B-3), Minako Yoshida (A-1, B-1, B-3), Tatsuro Yamashita (B-1), Akiko Yano (B-1), Taeko Ohnuki (B-1)

Chart Positions

Weekly charts

Year-end charts

References

1974 albums
Yumi Matsutoya albums
EMI Music Japan albums
Alfa Records albums